Baveno is a town and comune in the province of Verbano-Cusio-Ossola, part of Piedmont, northern Italy.

To the north-west are the famous red granite quarries, which have supplied the columns for the Cathedral of Milan, the church of San Paolo fuori le Mura at Rome, the Galleria Vittorio Emanuele at Milan and other important buildings.

One of the main attractions is a historic reach of villas and castles, built in the 19th century.

Baveno was occupied in the pre-Roman Iron Age by the Lepontii, a tribe of the Ligures.

Twin towns — sister cities
Baveno is twinned with:

  Nadur, Malta

References

External links

Baveno.org
Baveno Tourism Information

Cities and towns in Piedmont